Lucie Šafářová was the defending champion, but did not compete this year.

Zheng Jie won the title with the score tied at 1 set all, after her opponent Li Na was forced to retire due to a heat illness. It was the first title  of the year for Zheng and the second title in her career.

Seeds

Draw

Finals

Top half

Bottom half

References
 Main and Qualifying Rounds

2006 Estoril Open